Fields of Aplomb, abbreviated FoA, is a Gothic metal/alternative band formed in Baltimore in 1998 upon the demise of Pelican's Daughter. known for surrealistic and gloomy lyrics.  Their first album, Reverence for the Lost, addresses themes of extreme introversion.  Their second release Nekromanteia (2003), is based on the writings of Eliphas Levi (1810–1875), a French occultist who helped revive interest in magic in the 19th century. Levi studied magic and practiced necromancy on several occasions.  In 2004 FoA released Spiritum Oriundus as a continuance of spiritual magic, however, focusing on seances and tormented apparitions.  In the winter of 2006, FoA released Weoroscipe which illuminated the power of seduction, black magic, fetishes, and faith.  Disillusionment (2006) includes remaster of "Reverence for the Lost" and "Nekromaneia" plus two additional songs and a DVD. The band took their name from the folklore tale of the inscribed surrounding land to the ancient Sumerian society (Fourth B.C), stating that those who died, either violently or tragically, their souls were to wonder the Fields of Adplumbum (Aplomb) until they acknowledged and accepted their fate.

Sound
Fields of Aplomb combined a number of influences (punk music, ethereal, even Classical music and dub) to create a gloomy, but very passionate sound which appealed to many left looking for something new in the wake of 90's collapse. Their sound proved very influential, inspiring or bringing attention to a whole wave of groups delving in the intense, gloomy style that would return to earlier gothic rock.

History
Carolyn and Creston had known each other since the early 1990s, and used to play together in various bands, often not lasting more than one gig. One of the most long-lived of these was a band called Pelican's Daughter, who did a few gigs around Washington D.C. area. They soon split up too however, and Creston once again tried to convince his old Marine friend Steve Dargis to join him, simply because Creston thought he had the right look for a band.  Creston's old bandmate Carolyn came along for the keyboards and bass.  The line up was now complete.  Anna joined the band in 2005 on drums and keyboards.

Personnel
Anna Leska – percussion, programming, keys
Carolyn Baxter – keyboards, samplings, bass pedals, violin
Creston Baker – guitars, vocals

Discography
2002: Reverence for the Lost
2003: Nekromanteia
2004: Spiritum Oriundus
2006: Weoroscipe
2006: Disillusionment (Remaster of Reverence for the Lost and Nekromanteia plus DVD) Fall of 2006
2007: Theoretical Suicide (Scheduled for Winter of 2007)
2007: Pelican's Daughter's 1998 Regurgitate re-released (Christine Hendricks, Carolyn Baxter, Creston Baker, Steven Smith and Sven Mitchell).
2010: Carly Wade, Denamite, Leska and Baker side project, Symbols from the Driveway, to release Ambiguous in January 2010.
2012: Original Fields of Aplomb members, Baker, Baxter and Leska as Symbols from the Driveway, to release I am now in January 2012.
2013: Original Fields of Aplomb members, Baker, Baxter and Leska as Symbols from the Driveway, to release The Still of Being Unmoved on January 1, 2013.
2013: Fields of Aplomb will release the sixth studio CD, "Indefinite" scheduled for release in June 2013.
2015: symbols form the driveway will release the fourth studio CD, "Catenate" scheduled for release in February 2015.
2022: symbols form the driveway will release the fifth studio CD, "Brilliance in Movement" scheduled for release in February 14, 2022.

External links
Official website Looks to load to a placeholder page.

Musical groups established in 1998
American gothic metal musical groups
Alternative rock groups from Maryland
Musical groups from Baltimore